This is a list of countries by their gross domestic product at purchasing power parity per person currently employed.

See also
Workforce
Unemployment rate
Structural unemployment
List of countries by unemployment rate
List of countries by GDP (real) per capita growth rate
List of countries by GDP sector composition
List of countries by GDP (PPP) per capita
List of countries by GDP (nominal) per capita
List of countries by past and projected GDP (PPP) per capita
List of regions by past GDP (PPP) per capita
List of countries by average wage

References

Employed
GDP (PPP)